Najib Aga (born 5 January 1977) is a former Indian judoka. For his contribution to sports, he was awarded the Ekalavya Award in 1994, by the government of Karnataka.

Career
Najib Aga won the silver medal in the 65 kg category at the 1995 Asian Judo Championships in New Delhi. He competed in the 65 kg weight class at the 1996 Summer Olympics in Atlanta, US. He won the gold medal in the 73 kg weight category, in the 1998–99 Senior national Judo Championships in Bangalore. In the 1997 International Judo Championships in Indonesia, he won the bronze medal in the 71 kg class. He also represented the Border Security Force at the all-India Police Games and won medals, including a bronze in 2005, in the 66 kg category.

Later life
Post his retirement from judo, Aga launched a gym named Energy gym in Bangalore in 2004. In 2010, he contested in the BBMP municipal elections of Bangalore, from ward number 111, Shantala Nagar.

References

External links
 
 
 

Living people
Indian male judoka
1977 births
Martial artists from Karnataka
Indian male martial artists
Olympic judoka of India
Judoka at the 1996 Summer Olympics
20th-century Indian people